Entrance Island is a low island located inside the mouth of Franklin Harbor, Eyre Peninsula in South Australia. Its maximum elevation is approximately 4 metres. The island provides roosting and nesting habitat for a variety of sea and shorebird species.

On September 23, 1910, some shearers working on Entrance Island observed a distressed whale reported to be 90 feet long. It had become stranded at low tide, and it escaped when the tide rose. Smaller southern right whales have also been observed from Entrance Island.

References 

Islands of South Australia
Spencer Gulf
Eyre Peninsula